The 2016 Men's Central American and Caribbean Basketball Championship, also known as 2016 Centrobasket, was the regional basketball championship of FIBA Americas for the Central American and Caribbean subzone. The top five teams automatically qualified for Division A of the 2019 FIBA Basketball World Cup qualification and for the 2017 FIBA AmeriCup, with the top seven qualifying for the 2018 Central American and Caribbean Games. The tournament was held in the city of Panama City from June 19 to June 25.

Puerto Rico won its 11th Centrobasket title by defeating Mexico in the final, 84–83.

Participating teams 
 Automatic Qualifiers: (Top four in 2014 Centrobasket)
 
 
 
 
 Caribbean Sub-Zone: (Top three in 2015 FIBA CBC Championship)
 
 
 
 Central American Sub-Zone: (Top three in 2015 FIBA COCABA Championship)
  (Hosts)

Preliminary round 
The draw was held on 29 March 2016.

Group A

Group B

Final round

Semifinals

Seventh place game

Fifth place game

Third place game

Final

Final rankings 
The top five teams qualified for the 2017 FIBA AmeriCup and the top seven teams qualified for both the 2018 Central American and Caribbean Games and Division A of the 2019 FIBA Basketball World Cup qualification.

References

External links
FIBA
Draw Procediment

Centrobasket
2015–16 in North American basketball
2016 in Central American sport
2016 in Caribbean sport
2016 in Panamanian sport
International basketball competitions hosted by Panama
20th century in Panama City
Sports competitions in Panama City
June 2016 sports events in North America